Missouri is a midwestern U.S. state.

Missouri may also refer to:

People
 Missouri H. Stokes (1838-1910), American social reformer, writer

Places
Missouri Territory, a U.S. territory from 1812 to 1821
Missouri River, a U.S. river

Educational institutions
University of Missouri System
University of Missouri, the main campus of the system

Ships
CSS Missouri, an ironclad gunboat built by the Confederate States Navy in 1862
, the name of several merchant ships
, the name of five U.S. Navy vessels

Other
Missouria or Missouri, Native American tribe
Missouri (band), American rock band
Missouri (album), 1977 album by the band

See also
Missouri City, Missouri, a suburb of Kansas City
Missouri City, Texas, a suburb of Houston
Misery (disambiguation)
Mussoorie, Indian hill station